Love, Fear and the Time Machine is the sixth album by Polish progressive rock band Riverside. The album was released on 4 September 2015 through InsideOut Music.

Background
It was their final album to feature guitarist Piotr Grudziński before his death on 21 February 2016. Illustration, design and layout for the album were completed by Travis Smith. The album was recorded, mixed and mastered at Serakos Studio in Warsaw, Poland between November 2014 and June 2015 by Magda and Robert Srzednicki.

Prior to the release of the album on 9 July 2015, the label released a lyric video for "Discard Your Fear". The same day the album premiered  the band released a music video for "Found (The Unexpected Flaw of Searching)" and on 11 February 2016, another lyric video was released, this time for the song "Time Travellers."

Track listing

Personnel
Riverside
Mariusz Duda – vocals, bass, acoustic guitar, ukulele
Piotr Grudziński – guitar
Michał Łapaj – keyboards 
Piotr Kozieradzki – drums

Charts

References

2015 albums
Inside Out Music albums
Riverside (band) albums